Imke Vervaet (born 11 April 1993) is a Belgian athlete. She competed at the 2020 Summer Olympics, in 200 m.

She competed in the mixed 4 × 400 metres relay event at the 2019 World Athletics Championships. In 2020, she won the silver medal in the women's long jump event at the 2020 Belgian Indoor Athletics Championships held in Ghent, Belgium.

References

External links
 

1993 births
Living people
Belgian female sprinters
Place of birth missing (living people)
World Athletics Championships athletes for Belgium
Belgian Athletics Championships winners
Athletes (track and field) at the 2020 Summer Olympics
Olympic athletes of Belgium
Olympic female sprinters
20th-century Belgian women
21st-century Belgian women